The Global Heritage Stone Resource (GHSR) designation seeks international recognition of natural stone resources that have achieved widespread utilisation in human culture. Details of the “Global Heritage Stone Resource” proposal were first provided publicly at the 33rd International Geological Congress in Oslo in August 2008. However, this initiative was suggested in 2007 to enrich an international acknowledgment of famous dimension stones. At the same conference it was agreed to advance the GHSR proposal under the auspices of “Commission C-10 Building Stones and Ornamental Rocks” of the International Association for Engineering Geology and the Environment (IAEG). Since the Oslo conference the designation has also gained support from the International Union of Geological Sciences (IUGS).

, the following had been designated as 'GHSR's:
Portland stone
Larvikite
Petit Granit
Hallandia gneiss
Podpeč limestone
Carrara marble
Estremoz marble
Lede stone
Welsh slate
Piedra Mar del Plata
Kolmarden serpentine marble
Lioz Stone
Jacobsville Sandstone
Maltese Lower Globigerina limestone

In July 2019, the following were designated: 

 Lioz limestone 
 Alpedrete granite 
 Bath stone 
 Macael marble 
 Makrana marble 
 Pietra serena 
 Rosa Beta granite 
 Tennessee Marble

In 2023, the following was designated:

 Tyndall stone

See also
English Stone Forum

External links
Geoscienceworld.org page on GHSR book
Report on Stone-Ideas.com

References

Historic preservation
Building stone